In the United States, the chief of protocol is an officer of the United States Department of State responsible for advising the president of the United States, the vice president of the United States, and the United States secretary of state on matters of national and international diplomatic protocol. The chief of protocol holds the rank of Ambassador and Assistant Secretary of State.

Duties

The chief arranges itineraries for foreign dignitaries visiting the U.S. and accompanies the president on all official international travel. Additionally, the office is responsible for accrediting foreign diplomats and publishing the list of foreign consular offices in the U.S., organizing ceremonies for treaty signings, conducting ambassadorial swearing-in and state arrival ceremonies, and maintaining Blair House, the official guest house for state visitors.

The chief of protocol duties include being present at the annual State of the Union speech (SOTU) given by the president each January before Congress. These SOTU duties include escorting the dean of the Diplomatic Corps into the House Chamber for the SOTU speech.

The chief of protocol position should not be confused with the distinctly different White House social secretary position.

Divisions
The office identifies six divisions on its website, led by assistant chiefs, who oversee the following principal duties:

 Management
 Visits
 Ceremonials
 Diplomatic Affairs
 Blair House
 Major Events

List of chiefs of protocol of the United States

See also
 Chief of protocol
 Diplomatic rank
 Protocol (diplomacy)
 United States order of precedence

References

External links
 Office of the Chief of Protocol
 List of Chiefs of Protocol

 
United States Department of State agencies
 
Presidency of the United States
United States
Diplomatic protocol